Indonesia's transport system has been shaped over time by the economic resource base of an archipelago with thousands of islands, and the distribution of its more than 200 million people concentrated mainly on a single island, Java.

All modes of transport play a role in the country's transport system and are generally complementary rather than competitive. The railway system has five unconnected networks in Java and Sumatra primarily dedicated to transport bulk commodities and long-distance passenger traffic.

Sea transport is extremely important for economic integration, as well as for domestic and foreign trade. It is well developed, with each of the major islands having at least one significant port city. The role of inland waterways is relatively minor and is limited to certain areas of Eastern Sumatra and Kalimantan.

The function of air transport is significant, particularly where land or water transport is deficient or non-existent. It is based on an extensive domestic airline network in which all major cities can be reached by passenger plane.

Water transport

Merchant marine vessels

Because Indonesia encompasses a sprawling archipelago, maritime shipping provides essential links between different parts of the country.  Boats in common use include large container ships, a variety of ferries, passenger ships, sailing ships, and smaller motorised vessels. The traditional wooden pinisi vessel is still widely used as the inter-island freight service within Indonesian archipelago. Main pinisi traditional harbours are Sunda Kelapa in Jakarta and Paotere harbour in Makassar.

Frequent ferry services cross the straits between nearby islands, especially in the chain of islands stretching from Sumatra through Java to the Lesser Sunda Islands. On the busy crossings between Sumatra, Java, and Bali, multiple car ferries run frequently twenty-four hours per day. There are also international ferry services between across the Straits of Malacca between Sumatra and Malaysia, and between Singapore and nearby Indonesian islands, such as Batam. Ferry services are operated by state-owned ASDP Indonesia Ferry and several private operators.

A network of passenger ships makes longer connections to more remote islands, especially in the eastern part of the archipelago. The national shipping line, Pelni, provides passenger service to ports throughout the country on a two to four week schedule.  These ships generally provide the least expensive way to cover long distances between islands.  Smaller privately run boats provide service between islands.

On some islands, major rivers provide a key transportation link in the absence of good roads. On Kalimantan, longboats running on the rivers are the only way to reach many inland areas.

Waterways

Indonesia has 21,579 km of navigable waterways, of which about one half are on Kalimantan, and a quarter each on Sumatra and Papua. Waterways are highly needed because the rivers on these islands are not wide enough to hold medium-sized ships. In addition to this, roads and railways are not good options since Kalimantan and Papua are not like Java, which is a highly developed island. With the current length of waterways, Indonesia ranked seventh on the countries with longest waterways.

Ports and harbours 

Major ports and harbours include Bitung, Cilacap, Cirebon, Jakarta, Kupang, Palembang, Semarang, Surabaya, and Makassar. Ports are managed by the various Indonesia Port Corporations, of which there are four, numbered I through IV. Each has jurisdiction over various regions of the country, with I in the west and IV in the east. Port of Tanjung Priok in Jakarta is the Indonesia's busiest port, handling over 5.20 million TEUs.

A two-phase "New Tanjung Priok" extension project is currently underway, which will triple the existing annual capacity when fully operational in 2023. In 2015, ground breaking of the strategic North Sumatra's Kuala Tanjung Port has been completed. It is expected to accommodate 500,000 TEUs per year, overtaking Johor's Tanjung Pelepas Port and could even compete with the port of Singapore.

Roads and highways
A wide variety of vehicles are used for transportation on Indonesia's roads. Bus services are available in most areas connected to the road network. Between major cities, especially on Sumatra, Java, and Bali, services are frequent and direct; many express services are available with no stops until the final destination.

Intercity bus

The intercity bus service has become the major provider of land transportation service connecting Indonesian cities, either within an island or inter-island connected through ferry crossings. The intercity bus operator companies are called P.O. ( in Indonesian) with several major companies operating mainly in Java and Sumatra. The longest intercity bus service in Indonesia is a route operated by P.O. Antar Lintas Sumatera (ALS) connecting Medan in North Sumatra and Jember in East Java. It is a week long bus travel covering a distance of 2,920 kilometers.

The surge of intercity bus travel in Indonesia took place after the completion of Trans-Java highway section connecting Jakarta and Surabaya in 2018. During this time, some intercity bus services began operating fleet of double decker busses.

City bus

Some major cities has urban transit bus service, or a more sophisticated form of bus rapid transit (BRT). There are usually also bus services of various kinds such as the Kopaja in Jakarta. Other cities such as Yogyakarta (Trans Jogja), Palembang, Bandung, Denpasar, Pekanbaru, Semarang (Trans Semarang), Makassar, and Padang also have BRT systems in place without segregated lanes.

Taxis and autorickshaws

Many cities and towns have some form of transportation for hire available as well such as taxis. Many cities also have motorised autorickshaws (bajaj) of various kinds. Cycle rickshaws, called becak in Indonesia, are a regular sight on city roads and provide inexpensive transportation. They have been blamed for causing traffic congestion and, consequently, banned from most parts of Jakarta in 1972. Horse-drawn carts are found in some cities and towns.

Ridesharing companies have become serious competition to both taxicabs and motorcycle taxis (ojek), with the four providers being Gojek, Maxim, Anterin, Grab and others.

Minibus
In more remote areas, and between smaller towns, most services are provided with minibuses or minivans (angkot). Buses and vans are also the primary form of transportation within cities. Often, these are operated as share taxis, running semi-fixed routes.

Private cars
Due to the increasing purchasing power of Indonesians, private cars are becoming more common especially in major cities. However the growth of the number of cars increasingly outpaces the construction of new roads, resulting in frequently crippling traffic jams in large parts in major cities especially in Jakarta, which often also happen on highways. Jakarta also has one of the worst traffic jams in the world.

Indonesia has been gradually introducing an Intelligent Transportation System (ITS) since 2012. ITS Indonesia was formed on 26 April 2011.

National routes
Four of Indonesia's main highways are classified as parts of Asian Highway Network: AH2 section in Java and Bali, AH25 and AH151 in Sumatra, AH152 in Java and AH150 section in Kalimantan. Some of them has been numbered, currently only in Java and (partially) Sumatera.

National routes of Indonesia pass through the hearts of most main cities, and are designed to connect between city centres. They act as main inter-city route outside the tollways. A national route has to be passable by logistic trucks, while simultaneously handling the common traffic. National routes in Java are numbered, while those outside Java aren't. In some cities, even in crowded districts, national routes often form bypasses or ring roads (Indonesian: jalan lingkar) around the city to prevent inter-city traffic entering the city center.

Ministry of Public Works and People's Housing is responsible to these networks, except DKI Jakarta part from Jakarta Inner Ring Road to Jakarta Outer Ring Road. A national route can be revised if it serves unable to handle the traffic. It would usually be handled by the province/regional government.

Below were lists of some national routes in Indonesia:
 Sumatra: Trans-Sumatra Highway
 Java: North Coast, South Coast
 Kalimantan: Trans-Kalimantan Highway (Northern, Central, Southern)
 Sulawesi: Trans-Sulawesi Highway
 Papua: Trans-Papua Highway

Toll roads

The first expressway in Indonesia is the Jagorawi Toll Road, opened in 1978. Over  of expressways opened during the first term of President Joko Widodo, surpassing previous administrations. Since 2018, all expressways do not accept any cash tolls; all tolls must be paid with certain contactless bank cards.

The high cost of building and maintaining a national highway system means that Indonesia has to outsource the construction and maintenance to private and state-owned companies. Indonesia has an extensive system of highways consisting of:

Java

Sumatra

Sulawesi
 Makassar-Sultan Hasanuddin International Airport Toll Road
 Manado-Bitung Toll Road

Lesser Sunda Islands
Serangan-Tanjung Benoa Toll Road: The toll road between Tanjung Benoa to Airport and from Airport to Serangan, all in direct line (not curve) is 12.7 kilometres and is equipped also with motorcycle lanes. The toll road is formally opened on 23 September 2013, about a week before APEC Summit in Bali is opened.

Kalimantan
 Samarinda-Balikpapan Toll Road

Railways 

Indonesia's main railways, operated by Kereta Api Indonesia and its subsidiaries, is used for both passenger and freight transport.

The majority of railways is located on Java. There are four separate railway networks on Sumatra: one in Aceh, one in North Sumatra (Aceh connection proposed to be finished in 2020s), another in West Sumatra, and the final one in South Sumatra and Lampung. South Sulawesi has railway network in Barru Regency as the impact of Trans-Sulawesi Railway construction, although the network has not been used yet. There are no railways in other parts of Indonesia, although new networks are being developed on islands such as Kalimantan and Papua.

The inter-city rail network is complemented by local commuter rail services, particularly in Jakarta metropolitan area and Surabaya. In Jakarta, the KRL Commuterline service carries more than a million passengers a day. Urban rail networks are also exists in few cities. Palembang LRT began operations in 2018, the first of such kind. The Jakarta MRT and Jakarta LRT began operations in 2019, with the Greater Jakarta LRT system is currently under construction.

The government's plan to build a high-speed rail (HSR) was announced in 2015, the first in Indonesia and Southeast Asia. Plans were also mentioned for its possible extension to Surabaya, the country's second largest city.

Pipelines 
As of 2013, Indonesia has pipelines for condensate , condensate/gas , gas , liquid petroleum gas , oil , oil/gas/water , refined products , and water .

Air transport 

Air transport in Indonesia serves as a critical means of connecting the thousands of islands throughout the archipelago. With an estimated population of over 255 million people – making it the world's fourth-most-populous country – and also due to the growth of the middle-class, the boom of low-cost carriers in the recent decade, and overall economic growth, many domestic travellers shifted from land and sea transport to faster and more comfortable air travel. Indonesia is widely regarded as an emerging market for air travel in the region. Between 2009 and 2014, the number of Indonesian air passengers increased from 27,421,235 to 94,504,086, an increase of over threefold.

However, safety issues continue to be a persistent problem in Indonesian aviation. Several accidents have given Indonesia's air transport system the reputation of the least safe in the world. Indonesian aviation faces numerous challenges, including poorly maintained, outdated, and often overwhelmed infrastructure, the factor of human error, bad weather, haze problems caused by plantation fires, and volcanic ash spewed by numerous volcanoes that disrupts air transportation.

The Indonesian Air Force has 34,930 personnel equipped with 224 aircraft, among them 110 combat aircraft. The Indonesian Air Force possesses and operates numerous military air bases and military airstrips across the archipelago.

The International Air Transport Association (IATA) has predicted that Indonesia will become the world's sixth largest air travel market by 2034. Around 270 million passengers are predicted to fly from and within Indonesia by 2034.

Airports

As of 2013, there are 673 airports in Indonesia, 186 of those have paved runways, and 487 have unpaved runways. As of 2013, there are 76 heliports in Indonesia. Jakarta's Soekarno–Hatta International Airport serves as the country's main air transportation hub as well as the nation's busiest. Since 2010, it has become the busiest airport in Southeast Asia, surpassing Suvarnabhumi and Changi airports. In 2017, it became the 17th busiest airport in the world with 62.1 million passengers.

Airlines

In Indonesia, there are 22 commercial scheduled airlines that carry more than 30 passengers, and 32 commercial scheduled airlines that transport 30 or less passengers, as well as chartered airlines. Some notable Indonesian airlines, among others, include Garuda Indonesia, the government-owned flag carrier of Indonesia, Lion Air, currently the largest private low-cost carrier airline in Indonesia, Sriwijaya Air, currently the largest medium service regional carrier in Indonesia, also the country's third largest carrier, and Indonesia AirAsia, the Indonesian branch of Malaysian-based AirAsia.

Mudik 

Mudik, or Pulang Kampung, is an Indonesian term for the activity where migrants or migrant workers return to their hometown or village during or before major holidays, especially Lebaran (Eid al-Fitr). Although the mudik homecoming travel before Lebaran takes place in most Indonesian urban centers, the highlight is on the nation's largest urban agglomeration; Greater Jakarta, as millions of Jakartans exit the city by various means of transportation, overwhelming train stations and airports and also clogging highways, especially the Trans-Java toll road and Java's Northern Coast Road.

In 2017 it was estimated that the people that took annual mudik travel reached 33 million people. 
The demand for train and airplane tickets usually spikes a month or two prior to Lebaran, prompting an unusually higher cost for tickets for highly sought days of departure. Some airlines might add extra flights or operate larger airplanes to deal with the surge in demand.

Indonesian train operator Kereta Api Indonesia usually offers additional train trips or introduces longer trains with more cars in order to meet the demand. The private operators of intercity and interprovince buses usually charge higher ticket costs during this period. The impact is indeed tremendous as millions of buses, cars and motorcycles jam the roads and highways, causing kilometres of traffic jams each year.

See also 

 Bus transport in Indonesia
 Transport in Jakarta
 Ministry of Transportation

Notes

References

External links

 
Infrastructure in Indonesia